The Bodești is a left tributary of the river Crișul Alb in Romania. It discharges into the Crișul Alb near Pescari.

References

Rivers of Romania
Rivers of Arad County